Nelson class may refer to two classes of warships:

  : A class of two pre-Dreadnought battleships
  : A class of two battleships built between the two World Wars